Hardik Gohel is a computer scientist and educational leader. He is artificial intelligence, digital healthcare, cybersecurity, and advanced computing researcher. He is a faculty member and director of Applied Artificial Intelligence(AAI) laboratory at University of Houston at Victoria (UHV). Gohel is the AI/ML research faculty at University of Houston Hewlett Packard Enterprise Data Science Institute. Gohel is also a Senior Member of the Institute of Electrical and Electronics Engineers (IEEE) and executive faculty advisor of an international science group at UHV. Gohel is the first principal investigator in the history of UHV to get federal research contracts.

Gohel worked as a task leader in federal research projects at applied research center at Florida International University(FIU). Gohel also served as a postdoctoral advisory board member at FIU.

Education 
Gohel has received his Ph.D. in computer science from University of Hertfordshire, England in 2015. He has received his bachelor's and master's degree in computer science from Saurashtra University and Sardar Patel University, India.

Research 
Gohel has an extensive research experience in artificial intelligence and cyber test automation and monitoring, smart bandages for wound monitoring, bigdata for security intelligence, trustworthy cyberspace for security and privacy of social media, predictive maintenance for nuclear infrastructure, and database and mobile forensics infrastructure. He has 70 publications in the journals and proceedings of national and international conferences. In December 2020, his collaborative research on COVID-19 was recognized and listed in global literature by the World Health Organization(WHO).

Grants 
In January 2019, Gohel received postdoctoral travel grant from FIU-OPSS to participate and present research in top tier cybersecurity conference.  In February 2020, Gohel's graduate student also received internet society travel grant to attend the same top tier conference.

In April 2020, Gohel received Jr. faculty summer research grant  and In November 2020, he received multiyear collaborative federal STEM grant to develop students workforce in data science, cybersecurity, artificial intelligence and other advanced technical research areas to prepare students career in US defense system. In April 2021, Gohel received internal research grant award. In 2022, UHV has received first time federal contract for research. Gohel is the principal investigator on this project. The project is to conduct research on technologies including artificial intelligence for the U.S. Department of Energy

Community outreach 
In March 2021, Gohel has joined University of Houston’s Hewlett Packard Enterprise Data Science Institute as an AI/ML faculty researcher. This is to promote research, education, services, operations and outreach in data science and artificial intelligence across the Houston, Katy and Victoria, Texas areas.

In December 2020, Gohel has formed a UHV student branch of the Institute of Electrical and Electronics Engineers (IEEE), the world's largest technical professional organization. Gohel is also associated with virtual converges of international tech communities by webinars and noteworthy virtual datascience summer bootcamps for high school students.

Books 

 Data Visualization: Trends and Challenges Toward Multidisciplinary Perception
 Human Brain Computer Interface (H-BCI)
 Computational Approaches for Novel Therapeutic and Diagnostic Designing to Mitigate SARS-CoV2 Infection
 Introduction to Network & Cyber Security
 Applied ICT - Beyond Oceans & Spaces
 Book chapter : Developing Security Intelligence in Big Data

Awards and honors 
Gohel has received an academic and research excellence awards from Computer Society of India in 2015 and 2018. The Institute of Electrical and Electronics Engineers (IEEE) awarded him Senior Membership in 2020. In 2023, Gohel and his team member won best research paper award from IEEE for designing novel artificial neural networks to model hexavalent chromium concentration in groundwater wells over time using data collected from the Hanford Site, an area in Washington state that contains several decommissioned nuclear production reactors, laboratories and chemical reprocessing plants.

References 

Living people
Fellows of the American Association for the Advancement of Science
Senior Members of the IEEE
Indian computer scientists
American computer scientists
University of Houston System
Indian emigrants to the United States
1986 births
Gujarati people
Indian Hindus
Members of the United States National Academy of Engineering
University of Houston faculty